The Georgian Campaign (1508) was an attack against Georgia led by Selim I who was then the governor of Trabzon. 

In 1507 Selim successfully defeated the Safavid army at Erzincan. The following year, in 1508, he organised an attack against Georgia. He invaded and captured western Georgia bringing Imereti and Guria under Ottoman rule. During his campaign he enslaved a large amount of women, girls and boys, reportedly more than 10,000 Georgians.

References

Wars involving Georgia (country)
Battles involving the Ottoman Empire
Wars involving the Ottoman Empire